"Walls Come Tumbling Down!" is a song by English band the Style Council which was their ninth single to be released. It was written by lead vocalist Paul Weller, and released in 1985. It is the first single from the band's second studio album, Our Favourite Shop (1985). Our Favourite Shop was renamed Internationalists for the U.S. market.

The song "Blood Sports", which appeared on the single, is about anti-hunting and anti-animal blood sports. Its writing royalties went to the Bristol Defence Fund for two hunt saboteurs jailed for anti-blood sports activities.

The music video was filmed in Warsaw, Poland.

Compilation appearances
As well as the song's single release, it has featured on various compilation albums released by The Style Council. The song was included on The Singular Adventures of The Style Council, The Complete Adventures of The Style Council, and Greatest Hits.

Track listing
 12" single (TSCX 8)
"Walls Come Tumbling Down!"
"Spin Drifting"
"The Whole Point II"
"Blood Sports"

 7" single (TSCX 8)
"Walls Come Tumbling Down!" – 3:25
"The Whole Point II" – 2:50
"Blood Sports" – 3:25

Charts

References

1985 singles
The Style Council songs
Songs written by Paul Weller
1985 songs
Polydor Records singles